Cedoux is an unincorporated community in the Rural Municipality of Wellington No. 97 in the province of Saskatchewan, Canada. It is held village status prior to July 21, 1913.

History

The colonization of the community of Cedoux, situated 15 miles north of Weyburn, began to form in 1902 with the arrival of a few Polish and Ukrainian
settlers. The official date that Cedoux was named is unknown. It was believed at first to have been named the same time as Cedoux Post Office, April 1, 1905, but a
receipt shows it as having possibly been named as early as July 9, 1904. Cedoux became a village on July 21, 1913.

References 

Former villages in Saskatchewan
Wellington No. 97, Saskatchewan
Populated places established in 1902
Division No. 2, Saskatchewan